Naheed Abidi is an Indian scholar of Sanskrit and writer. In 2014, she was honoured with Padma Shri, the fourth highest civilian award, for her contributions to the field of literature by the Government of India.

Biography

Naheed Abidi was born in 1961, in a Shia Muslim zamindari family at Mirzapur, in the Indian state of Uttar Pradesh. Choosing Sanskrit as her subject, Abidi did her graduation at the Kamla Maheshwari Degree College and secured her MA from the K. V. Degree College, Mirzapur.

She moved to Varanasi, an ancient seat of Sanskrit scholarship after her marriage with Ehtesham Abidi - an advocate in the city. Varanasi is deemed holy by the Hindu text Garuda Purana. She went on to secure a doctoral degree (PhD) from the Mahatma Gandhi Kashi Vidyapith (MGKV), a public university in the city, and published her thesis titled as Vedic Sahitya Mein Ashviniyon Ka Swaroop (The Form of Ashvinis in Vedic Literature) in 1993.

In 2005, Abidi started working as a lecturer without any pay at Banaras Hindu University. Soon after, she joined the Mahatma Gandhi Kashi Vidyapith to work as a part-time lecturer on a daily wage scheme. However, the Sanskrit scholar, known as the first Muslim female to have worked as a lecturer in Sanskrit, had difficulties finding a regular job. Her first book was published in 2008 and was titled Sanskrit Sahitya Mein Rahim - which is an account of the Sanskrit leanings of the renowned poet, Abdul Rahim Khan-e-Khana. This was followed by Devalayasya Deepa, a translation of Chairag-e-Dair, written by poet, Mirza Ghalib. The third book was Sirr-e-Akbar, a Hindi translation of 50 Upanishads, earlier translated by the Mughal prince, Dara Shikoh into Persian. She has published a Hindi translation of Vedanta, translated into Persian by Dara Shikoh and also the Sufi texts by the prince.

Naheed Abidi lives with her spouse Ehtesham Abidi and her two children, a son and a daughter, in VDA colony in the Shivpur area of Varanasi. She also serves as an Executive Council member at the Sampurnanad Sanskrit University.

Awards and recognitions
Naheed Abidi was conferred with Padma Shri, in 2014, by the Government of India, for her services to literature. She has also been conferred DLitt (Honoris Causa) by the Lucknow University. 
Abidi met Narendra Modi, the Prime Minister of India on 9 September 2014 at the latter's residence and presented two of the books written by her. The meeting was announced by Modi through a photo on his Google Plus page and the video of the meeting was displayed on the personal web site of the Prime Minister. In 2016, She was honored with the Yash Bharati Award by UP government at a function held in Lucknow.

Literary contributions

See also
 Mahatma Gandhi Kashi Vidyapith
 Abdul Rahim Khan-I-Khana

References

External links

Further reading
 

1961 births
Living people
Indian Shia Muslims
Recipients of the Padma Shri in literature & education
20th-century Indian women writers
20th-century Indian writers
Indian women scholars
People from Mirzapur
Indian Sanskrit scholars
Women writers from Uttar Pradesh
Scholars from Varanasi
20th-century Indian educational theorists
Indian women educational theorists
Women educators from Uttar Pradesh
Educators from Uttar Pradesh
20th-century women educators